The 4th Siberian Army Corps was an Army corps in the Imperial Russian Army.

Composition
1905:
2nd Siberian Rifle Division
3rd Siberian Rifle Division
1914:
9th Siberian Rifle Division
10th Siberian Rifle Division

Part of
1st Manchurian Army: 1904–1906
12th Army: 1915
2nd Army: 1915–1916
3rd Army: 1916
8th Army: 1916
6th Army: 1916–1917

Commanders
1904–1905: Nikolai Zarubaev
1912–1913: Arkady Nikanorovich Nishenkov
1913–1915: Sergey Sergeevich Savvich
1915: Sychyovsky
1915–1917: Otto Leonidas Sirelius
1917: Sokolov

Corps of the Russian Empire